The Soviet Union (USSR) competed, for the last time before its dissolution, at the 1988 Summer Olympics in Seoul. 481 competitors, 319 men and 162 women, took part in 221 events in 27 sports. Athletes from 12 of the ex-Soviet republics would compete as the Unified Team at the 1992 Summer Olympics, and each nation would field independent teams in subsequent Games.

The Soviet Union utterly dominated the medal count, winning 55 gold and 132 total medals. Currently, China's 48 gold medals in 2008 and USA's 121 total medals in 2016 are the closest results to USSR's 1988 performance. The Soviet Union medal tally currently ranks fourth both in terms of gold and total medals, after USA's 1984 performance, USSR's 1980 performance, USA's 1904 performance, and Britain's 1908 performance.

Medalists

Competitors
The following is the list of number of competitors in the Games.

Archery

Women's Individual Competition:
Lioudmila Arjannikova – final, 4th place
T. Mountain – final, 8th place
N. Boutouzova – quarterfinal, 18th place

Men's Individual Competition:
Vladimir Echeev – final, bronze medal
K. Chkolny – 1/8 final, 20th place
Juri Leontiev – preliminary round, 29th place

Women's tournament:
Arjannikova, Mountain and Boutouzova – final, 4th place

Men's tournament:
Echeev, Chkolny and Leontiev – final, 5th place

Athletics

Men's competition
Men's Marathon 
 Ravil Kashapov 
 Final — 2:13.49 (→ 10th place)

Men's long jump 
 Leonid Volochine
 Qualification — 7.89m 
 Final — 7.89m (→ 8th place)

 Robert Emmiyan
 Qualification — DNF (→ did not advance)

 Vladimir Otchkan
 Qualification — DNS (→ did not advance)

Men's discus throw
 Romas Ubartas
 Qualification – 65.58m
 Final – 67.48m (→  Silver medal)

 Yuriy Dumchev
 Qualification – 62.08m
 Final – 66.42m (→ 4th place)

 Vaclavas Kidykas
 Qualification – 60.88m (→ did not advance)

Men's shot put
 Sergey Smirnov
 Qualification — 20.48m
 Final — 20.36m (→ 8th place)

Men's Hammer Throw
 Sergey Litvinov
 Qualification — 81.24m
 Final — 84.80m (→  Gold medal)

 Yuriy Sedykh
 Qualification — 78.48m
 Final — 83.76m (→  Silver medal)

 Jüri Tamm
 Qualification — 69.68m
 Final — 81.16m (→  Bronze medal)

Men's javelin throw 
 Viktor Yevsyukov 
 Qualification — 79.26m
 Final — 82.32m (→ 5th place)

 Vladimir Ovchinnikov 
 Qualification — 80.26m
 Final — 79.12m (→ 7th place)

Men's decathlon 
 Pavel Tarnovetsky — 8167 points (→ 10th place) 
 100 metres — 11.23s
 Long Jump — 7.28m
 Shot Put — 15.25m
 High Jump — 1.97m
 400 metres — 48.60s
 110m Hurdles — 14.76s
 Discus Throw — 48.02m
 Pole Vault — 5.20m
 Javelin Throw — 59.48m
 1.500 metres — 4:52.24s

Men's 20 km Walk
 Mikhail Shchennikov
 Final — 1:20:47 (→ 6th place)

 Aleksey Pershin
 Final — 1:22:32 (→ 14th place)

 Yevgeniy Misyulya
 Final — 1:24:39 (→ 27th place)

Men's 50 km Walk
 Vyacheslav Ivanenko
 Final — 3:38:29 (→  Gold medal)

 Aleksandr Potashov
 Final — 3:41:00 (→ 4th place)

 Vitaliy Popovych
 Final — 3:59:23 (→ 26th place)

Women's competition
Women's 4 × 400 m Relay 
 Lyudmila Dzhigalova, Olga Nazarova, Mariya Pinigina and Olga Bryzgina 
Heat — 3:27.14 
 Tatyana Ledovskaya, Olga Nazarova, Mariya Pinigina and  Olga Bryzgina 
Final — 3:15.18 (→  Gold medal)

Women's Marathon 
 Tatyana Polovinskaya 
 Final — 2:27.05 (→ 4th place)
 
 Zoya Ivanova 
 Final — 2:30.25 (→ 9th place)
 
 Raisa Smekhnova 
 Final — 2:33.19 (→ 16th place)

Women's discus throw
 Ellina Zvereva
 Qualification – 63.26m
 Final – 68.94m (→ 5th place)

 Larisa Mikhalchenko
 Qualification – 64.32m
 Final – 64.08m (→ 10th place)

 Galina Murasova
 Qualification – 62.54m
 Final – NM (→ no ranking)

Women's javelin throw
 Irina Kostyuchenkova
 Qualification – 63.24m
 Final – 67.00m (→ 4th place)

 Natalya Yermolovich
 Qualification – 64.44m
 Final – 64.84m (→ 6th place)

Women's shot put
 Natalya Lisovskaya
 Qualification – 19.78m
 Final – 22.24m (→  Gold medal)

 Natalya Akhrimenko
 Qualification – 19.40m
 Final – 20.13m (→ 7th place)

 Valentina Fedjuschina
 Qualification – 19.06m (→ did not advance)

Women's Heptathlon 
 Natalya Shubenkova
 Final Result — 6540 points (→ 4th place)

 Remigija Sablovskaitė
 Final Result — 6456 points (→ 5th place)

 Svetlana Buraga
 Final Result — 6232 points (→ 10th place)

Basketball

Men's tournament

Team roster

Group play

Quarterfinals

Semifinals

Gold medal match

Women's tournament

Team roster

Group play

Semifinals

Bronze medal match

Boxing

Men's Light Flyweight (– 48 kg)
 Alexander Makhmutov
 First Round — Bye
 Second Round — Defeated Carlos Eluaiza (Argentina), 5:0
 Third Round — Defeated Jesus Beltre (Dominican Republic), 4:1
 Quarterfinals — Lost to Ivailo Marinov (Bulgaria), 0:5

Men's Flyweight (– 51 kg)
Timofey Skryabin

Men's Bantamweight (– 54 kg)
Aleksandr Artemyev

Men's Featherweight (– 57 kg)
Mekhak Ghazaryan

Men's Lightweight (– 60 kg)
Kostya Tszyu

Men's Light-Welterweight (– 63.5 kg)
Vyacheslav Yanovsky

Men's Welterweight (– 67 kg)
Vladimir Yereshchenko

Men's Light-Middleweight (– 71 kg)
Yevgeni Zaytsev

Men's Middleweight (– 75 kg)
Ruslan Taramov

Men's Light-Heavyweight (– 81 kg)
Nurmagomed Shanavazov

Men's Heavyweight (– 91 kg)
Ramzan Sebiyev

Men's Super-Heavyweight (+ 91 kg)
Alex Miroshnichenko

Canoeing

Cycling

Eighteen cyclists, fourteen men and four women, represented the Soviet Union in 1988.

Men's road race
 Djamolidine Abdoujaparov
 Asiat Saitov
 Riho Suun

Men's team time trial
 Vasil Zhdanov
 Viktor Klimov
 Asiat Saitov
 Igor Sumnikov

Men's sprint
 Nikolai Kovsh

Men's 1 km time trial
 Aleksandr Kirichenko

Men's individual pursuit
 Gintautas Umaras

Men's team pursuit
 Viatcheslav Ekimov
 Artūras Kasputis
 Dmitry Nelyubin
 Gintautas Umaras
 Mindaugas Umaras

Men's points race
 Marat Ganeyev

Women's road race
 Laima Zilporytė — 2:00:52 (→  Bronze medal)
 Valentina Yevpak — 2:00:52 (→ 5th place)
 Alla Jakovleva — 2:00:52 (→ 34th place)

Women's sprint
 Erika Salumäe

Diving

Men's 10m Platform
Georgy Chogovadze
Preliminary Round — 540.90 
Final — 585.96 (→ 4th place)

Vladimir Timoshinin
Preliminary Round — 570.75 
Final — 534.66 (→ 8th place)

Equestrian

Men's show jump team
Raimundas Udrakis

Fencing

20 fencers, 15 men and 5 women, represented the Soviet Union in 1988.

Men's foil
 Aleksandr Romankov
 Ilgar Mamedov
 Boris Koretsky

Men's team foil
 Aleksandr Romankov, Ilgar Mamedov, Vladimer Aptsiauri, Anvar Ibragimov, Boris Koretsky

Men's épée
 Andrey Shuvalov
 Wladimir Reznitschenko
 Mykhailo Tyshko

Men's team épée
 Andrey Shuvalov, Pavel Kolobkov, Wladimir Reznitschenko, Mykhailo Tyshko, Igor Tikhomirov

Men's sabre
 Heorhiy Pohosov
 Andrey Alshan
 Sergey Mindirgasov

Men's team sabre
 Sergey Mindirgasov, Mikhail Burtsev, Heorhiy Pohosov, Andrey Alshan, Sergey Koryashkin

Women's foil
 Tatyana Sadovskaya
 Yelena Glikina
 Olga Voshchakina

Women's team foil
 Yelena Glikina, Yelena Grishina, Tatyana Sadovskaya, Marina Soboleva, Olga Voshchakina

Football

Gymnastics

Handball

Hockey

Men's tournament
Preliminary round (group B)
 Soviet Union – India 1–0
 Soviet Union – South Korea 3–1
 Soviet Union – Canada 0–0
 Soviet Union – Great Britain 1–3
 Soviet Union – West Germany 0–6
Classification Matches
 5th–8th place: Soviet Union – Pakistan 0–1
 7th–8th place: Soviet Union – Argentina 4–1 (→ 7th place)

Team roster
 (01.) Vladimir Pleshakov (gk)
 (02.) Viktor Deputatov
 (03.) Igor Yulchiev
 (04.) Sos Hayrapetyan
 (05.) Nikolai Sankovetch
 (06.) Vladimir Antakov (captain)
 (07.) Vyacheslav Chechenev
 (08.) Igor Atanov
 (09.) Sergei Chakhvorostov
 (10.) Sergei Pleshakov
 (11.) Mikhail Nechipurenko
 (12.) Alexander Domachev (gk)
 (13.) Igor Davydov
 (14.) Aleksandr Miasnikov
 (15.) Yevgeni Nechaev
 (16.) Mikhail Bukatin
Head coach: Leonid Pavlovsky

Judo

Modern pentathlon

Three male pentathletes represented the Soviet Union in 1988. Vaho Iagorashvili won a bronze in the individual event.

Individual
 Vaho Iagorashvili
 German Yuferov
 Anatoly Avdeyev

Team
 Vaho Iagorashvili
 German Yuferov
 Anatoly Avdeyev

Rhythmic gymnastics

Rowing

The Soviet Union had 30 male and 23 female rowers participate in all 14 rowing events in 1988.

Men's competition
 Men's single sculls 
 Jüri Jaanson

 Men's double sculls
 Oleksandr Marchenko
 Vasil Yakusha

 Men's coxless pair
 Igor Zuborenko
 Valery Vyrvich

 Men's coxed pair
 Andrey Korikov
 Roman Kazantsev
 Andrey Lipsky (cox)

 Men's quadruple sculls
 Pavel Krupko
 Oleksandr Zaskalko
 Sergey Kinyakin
 Yuriy Zelikovich

 Men's coxless four
 Ivan Vysotskiy
 Sergey Smirnov
 Yuriy Pimenov
 Nikolay Pimenov

 Men's coxed four
 Sigitas Kučinskas
 Jonas Narmontas
 Vladimir Romanishin
 Igor Zotov
 Sergey Titov (cox)

 Men's eight
 Veniamin But
 Mykola Komarov
 Vasily Tikhonov
 Aleksandr Dumchev
 Pavlo Hurkovskiy
 Viktor Diduk
 Viktor Omelyanovich
 Andrey Vasilyev
 Aleksandr Lukyanov (cox)

Women's competition
 Women's single sculls 
 Nataliya Kvasha

 Women's double sculls
 Marina Zhukova
 Mariya Omelianovych

 Women's coxless pair
 Sarmīte Stone
 Marina Smorodina

 Women's quadruple sculls
 Irina Kalimbet
 Svitlana Maziy
 Inna Frolova
 Antonina Zelikovich

 Women's coxed four
 Reda Ribinskaitė
 Elena Tereshina
 Irina Teterina
 Marina Suprun
 Valentina Khokhlova (cox)

 Women's eight
 Margarita Teselko
 Marina Znak
 Nadezhda Sugako
 Sandra Brazauskaitė
 Olena Pukhaieva
 Sariya Zakyrova
 Nataliya Fedorenko
 Lidiya Averyanova
 Aušra Gudeliūnaitė (cox)

Sailing

Shooting

Swimming

Men's 50 m Freestyle
 Gennadiy Prigoda
 Heat – 22.57
 Final – 22.71 (→  Bronze medal)
 Vladimir Tkachenko
 Heat – 22.81
 Final – 22.88 (→ 6th place)

Men's 100 m Freestyle
 Gennadiy Prigoda
 Heat – 50.13
 Final – 49.75 (→ 4th place)
 Yuri Bashkatov
 Heat – 50.08
 Final – 50.08 (→ 5th place)

Men's 200 m Freestyle
 Alexei Kouznetsov
 Heat – 1:50.84
 B-Final – 1:51.03 (→ 12th place)
 Yuri Bashkatov
 Heat – 1:52.04 (→ did not advance, 22nd place)

Men's 400 m Freestyle
 Alexandre Bazanov
 Heat – 3:58.74 (→ did not advance, 27th place)

Men's 1500 m Freestyle
 Vladimir Salnikov
 Heat – 15:07.83
 Final – 15:00.40 (→  Gold medal)

Men's 100 m Backstroke
 Igor Polyansky
 Heat – 55.04
 Final – 55.20 (→  Bronze medal)
 Serguei Zabolotnov
 Heat – 56.13
 Final – 55.37 (→ 4th place)

Men's 200 m Backstroke
 Igor Polyansky
 Heat – 2:01.70
 Final – 1:59.37 (→  Gold medal)
 Serguei Zabolotnov
 Heat – 2:01.27
 Final – 2:00.52 (→ 4th place)

Men's 100 m Breaststroke
 Dmitry Volkov
 Heat – 1:02.49
 Final – 1:02.20 (→  Bronze medal)
 Alexei Matveev
 Heat – 1:03.25
 B-Final – 1:03.01 (→ 9th place)

Men's 200 m Breaststroke
 Valeri Lozik
 Heat – 2:16.31
 Final – 2:16.16 (→ 5th place)
 Vadim Alexeev
 Heat – 2:17.15
 B-Final – 2:16.70 (→ 6th place)

Men's 100 m Butterfly
 Vadim Yaroshchuk
 Heat – 54.17
 Final – 54.60 (→ 8th place)
 Konstantine Petrov
 Heat – 55.84 (→ did not advance, 23rd place)

Men's 200 m Butterfly
 Vadim Yaroshchuk
 Heat – 2:01.05
 B-Final – 2:00.34 (→ 11th place)

Men's 200 m Individual Medley
 Vadim Yaroshchuk
 Heat – 2:02.77
 Final – 2:02.40 (→  Bronze medal)
 Mikhail Zoubkov
 Heat – 2:03.79
 Final – 2:02.92 (→ 4th place)

Men's 400 m Individual Medley
 Mikhail Zoubkov
 Heat – 4:25.30
 B-Final – 4:25.44 (→ 13th place)

Men's 4 × 100 m Freestyle Relay
 Raimundas Mažuolis, Alexei Borislavski, Nikolai Evseev and Vladimir Tkachenko
 Heat – 3:19.89
 Gennadiy Prigoda, Yuri Bashkatov, Nikolai Evseev and Vladimir Tkachenko
 Final – 3:18.33 (→  Silver medal)

Men's 4 × 200 m Freestyle Relay
 Serguei Kouriaev, Alexandre Bazanov, Nikolai Evseev and Aleksei Kouznetsov
 Heat – DSQ (→ did not advance, no ranking)

Men's 4 × 100 m Medley Relay
 Serguei Zabolotnov, Valeri Lozik, Konstantine Petrov and Nikolai Evseev
 Heat – 3:45.29
 Igor Polyansky, Dmitry Volkov, Vadim Yaroshchuk and Gennadiy Prigoda
 Final – 3:39.96 (→  Bronze medal)

Women's 50 m Freestyle
 Inna Abramova
 Heat – 26.27
 B-Final – 26.48 (→ 14th place)

Women's 100 m Freestyle
 Natalia Trefilova
 Heat – 56.66
 B-Final – 56.48 (→ 9th place)
 Svetlana Issakova
 Heat – 57.17
 B-Final – 57.07 (→ 15th place)

Women's 200 m Freestyle
 Natalia Trefilova
 Heat – 2:00.54
 Final – 1:59.24 (→ 5th place)

Women's 400 m Freestyle
 Natalia Trefilova
 Heat – 4:12.20
 Final – 4:13.92 (→ 8th place)

Women's 800 m Freestyle
 Natalia Trefilova
 Heat – 8:43.19 (→ did not advance, 15th place)

Women's 100 m Breaststroke
 Yelena Volkova
 Heat – 1:09.86
 Final – 1:09.24 (→ 5th place)
 Svetlana Kouzmina
 Heat – 1:10.83
 B-Final – 1:10.42 (→ 9th place)

Women's 200 m Breaststroke
 Yulia Bogatcheva
 Heat – 2:28.94
 Final – 2:28.54 (→ 5th place)
 Svetlana Kouzmina
 Heat – 2:30.93
 B-Final – 2:30.03 (→ 10th place)

Women's 100 m Butterfly
 Svetlana Koptchikova
 Heat – 1:01.65
 B-Final – 1:01.48 (→ 9th place)

Women's 200 m Butterfly
 Svetlana Koptchikova
 Heat – 2:15.26
 B-Final – 2:14.43 (→ 12th place)

Women's 200 m Individual Medley
 Yelena Dendeberova
 Heat – 2:15.30
 Final – 2:13.31 (→  Silver medal)
 Yulia Bogatcheva
 Heat – 2:19.07
 B-Final – 2:19.91 (→ 15th place)

Women's 400 m Individual Medley
 Yelena Dendeberova
 Heat – 4:46.63
 Final – 4:40.44 (→ 4th place)

Women's 4 × 100 m Freestyle Relay
 Inna Abramova, Svetlana Issakova, Yelena Dendeberova and Svetlana Koptchikova
 Heat – 3:46.28
 Yelena Dendeberova, Svetlana Issakova, Natalia Trefilova and Svetlana Koptchikova
 Final – 3:44.99 (→ 5th place)

Synchronized swimming

Three synchronized swimmers represented the Soviet Union in 1988.

Women's solo
 Christina Thalassinidou
 Mariya Chernyayeva
 Tatyana Titova

Women's duet
 Mariya Chernyayeva
 Tatyana Titova

Table tennis

Tennis

Men's Singles Competition
 Alexander Volkov
 First round — Lost to Carl-Uwe Steeb (West Germany) 5–7 4–6 3–6

Women's Singles Competition
 Larisa Neiland
 First Round – Bye
 Second Round – Defeated Sara Gomer (Great Britain) 6–7 7–6 9–7 
 Third Round – Defeated Il-Soon Kim (South Korea) 6–3 7–6 
 Quarterfinals – Lost to Steffi Graf (West Germany) 2–6 6–4 3–6
 Leila Meskhi
 First Round – Defeated Regina Rajchrtová (Czechoslovakia) 7–5 7–5
 Second Round – Lost to Steffi Graf (West Germany) 5–7 1–6
 Natasha Zvereva
 First Round – Bye
 Second Round – Defeated Anne Minter (Australia) 6–4 3–6 6–1 
 Third Round – Defeated Tine Scheuer-Larsen (Denmark) 6–1 6–2 
 Quarterfinals – Lost to Gabriela Sabatini (Argentina) 4–6 3–6

Volleyball

Men's tournament 
Preliminary round (group A)
 Defeated Bulgaria (3–0)
 Defeated Sweden (3–0)
 Defeated South Korea (3–0)
 Defeated Italy (3–1)
 Lost to Brazil (2–3)
Semi Finals
 Defeated Argentina (3–0)
Final
 Lost to the United States (1–3) →  Silver medal

Team roster
Yuri Panchenko
Andrei Kuzentsov
Vyatcheslav Zaytsev
Igor Runov
Vladimir Chkourikhine
Yevgueny Krasilnikov
Raimond Vilde
Valery Lossev
Yuri Sapega
Oleksandr Sorokalet
Yaroslav Antonov
Yuri Tcherednik
Head coach: Guennady Parchine

Women's tournament
 Preliminary round (group A)
 Lost to Japan (2–3)
 Defeated South Korea (3–2)
 Defeated East Germany (3–0)
 Semi Finals
 Defeated PR China (3–0)
 Final
 Defeated Peru (3–2) →  Gold medal
 Team roster
Valentina Ogienko 
Yelena Volkova 
Irina Smirnova-Ilchenko 
Tatyana Sidorenko 
Irina Parkhomchuk-Kirillova 
Olga Shkournova 
Marina Nikulina 
Elena Ovtchnikova 
Olga Krivocheeva 
Svetlana Korytova 
Marina Koumych 
Tatyana Krainova 
Head coach: Nikolai Karpol

Water polo

Men's tournament
 Preliminary round (group A)
 Drew with Italy (9–9)
 Defeated Australia (11–4)
 Defeated France (14–8)
 Defeated South Korea (17–4)
 Lost to West Germany (8–9)
 Semi Finals
 Lost to United States (7–8)
 Bronze medal match
 Defeated West Germany (14–13) →  Bronze medal

 Team roster
 Evgueni Charonov
 Nourlan Mendygaliev
 Evgeni Grichine
 Alexandre Kolotov
 Sergei Naoumov
 Victor Berendiouga
 Serguei Kotenko
 Dmitri Apanasenko
 Georgui Mchvenieradze
 Mikhail Ivanov
 Serguei Markotch
 Nikolai Smirnov
 Mikhail Giorgadze
Head coach: Boris Popov

Weightlifting

Wrestling

Men's freestyle 

Alexander Karelin — Wrestling, Heavyweight

See also
 Soviet Union at the 1988 Summer Paralympics

References

Nations at the 1988 Summer Olympics
1988
Summer Olympics
Korea–Soviet Union relations